Rasendra Nath Barman is an Indian politician. He was elected to the Lok Sabha, lower house of the Parliament of India from Balurghat, West Bengal as a member of the Indian National Congress.

References

External links
 Official Biographical Sketch in Lok Sabha Website

Indian National Congress politicians
India MPs 1971–1977
Lok Sabha members from West Bengal
1936 births
Living people